Morgan Day is an American-born Puerto Rican footballer who plays as a midfielder for the Puerto Rico women's national team.

Early life 
Day was raised in El Granada, California and attended Half Moon Bay High School.

International career 
On 21 October 2021, Day made her senior debut for Puerto Rico, in a 6–1 friendly victory over Guyana.

References 

2001 births
Living people
Women's association football midfielders
Puerto Rican women's footballers
Puerto Rico women's international footballers
American women's soccer players
Soccer players from California
American sportspeople of Puerto Rican descent
Academy of Art Urban Knights women's soccer players